The 2022 Ohio State Buckeyes men's volleyball team represents Ohio State University in the 2022 NCAA Division I & II men's volleyball season. The Buckeyes, led by 3rd year head coach Kevin Burch, play their home games at Covelli Center. The Buckeyes are members of the Midwestern Intercollegiate Volleyball Association and were picked to finish third in the MIVA in the preseason poll.

Roster

Schedule

 *-Indicates conference match.
 Times listed are Eastern Time Zone.

Broadcasters
Central State: Brendan Gulick & Hanna Williford
Central State: Brendan Gulick & Greg Franke 
St. Francis: Brendan Gulick & Neil Sika
UCLA: Anne Marie Anderson
USC: Denny Cline
Long Beach State: Matt Brown & Tyler Kulakowski
UC Santa Barbara: Max Kelton & Katie Spieler
McKendree: Colin Suhre
Lewis: Patrick Hennessey, Juliana Van Loo, & Ally Hickey
Loyola Chicago: Keith Kokinda & Hanna Williford
Purdue Fort Wayne: Tyler Danburg & Hanna Williford
Quincy: Tyler Danburg & Hanna Williford
Lindenwood: Brendan Gulick & Hanna Williford
Lincoln Memorial: Tyler Danburg
Lincoln Memorial: Greg Franke
Penn State: Tyler Danburg & Joey Veer
St. Francis: Matt Manz & Sophie Rice
Penn State: Mac Young & Austin Groft
Ball State: Brendan Gulick & Hanna Williford
Ball State: No commentary
Lindenwood: Michael Wagenknecht & Sara Wagenknecht
Quincy: No commentary
Lewis: Brendan Gulick & Zachary Rodier
McKendree: Caleb Spinner & Hanna Williford
Purdue Fort Wayne: Mike Maahs & Steve Florio
Loyola Chicago: Scott Sudikoff & Kris Berzins
Lewis: No commentary

Rankings 

^The media did not release a pre-season poll.

Honors
To be filled in upon completion of the season.

References

2022 in sports in Ohio
2022 NCAA Division I & II men's volleyball season
2022 team
Ohio State